En Vivo: Desde el Auditorio Nacional (Eng.: Live: From the Mexican Auditorium) is a live album by Mexican Duranguense band K-Paz de la Sierra. It was released on February 19, 2008. This album became their third number-one set on the Billboard Top Latin Albums.

Track listing CD/DVD
The information from Billboard.

Chart performance

References

K-Paz de la Sierra live albums
Spanish-language live albums
2008 live albums
Disa Records live albums
Albums recorded at the Auditorio Nacional (Mexico)